Jaffueliobryum is a genus of moss in family Ptychomitriaceae.

Species
It contains the following species:
 Jaffueliobryum arsenei — endemic to Mexico.

See also

References

Bryophyta of North America
Moss genera
Grimmiales
Taxonomy articles created by Polbot